This is a list of prefects of the Province of Zara (now modern Zadar and its surrounding area, in Croatia).

List of prefects

List of German military commanders, 1943–44

See also
 History of Dalmatia
 Governorate of Dalmatia
 Dalmatian Italians

References

External links
 World Statesmen – Croatia (Zara/Zadar)

Zara
History of Zadar
Zara, Governors of the province of
Zara, Governors of the province of